This list of Internet top-level domains  (TLD) contains top-level domains, which are those domains in the DNS root zone of the Domain Name System of the Internet. A list of the top-level domains by the Internet Assigned Numbers Authority (IANA) is maintained at the Root Zone Database. IANA also oversees the approval process for new proposed top-level domains for ICANN. , their root domain contains 1502 top-level domains. , the IANA root database includes 1589 TLDs. That also includes 68 that are not assigned (revoked), 8 that are retired and 11 test domains. Those are not represented in IANA's listing and are not in root.zone file (root.zone file also includes one root domain).

Types

IANA distinguishes the following groups of top-level domains:

 infrastructure top-level domain (ARPA)
 generic top-level domains (gTLD)
 generic-restricted top-level domains (grTLD)
 sponsored top-level domains (sTLD)
 country code top-level domains (ccTLD)
 test top-level domains (tTLD)

Original top-level domains
Seven generic top-level domains were created early in the development of the Internet, and predate the creation of ICANN in 1998.
 Name: DNS names
 Entity: intended use
 Notes: general remarks
 IDN: support for internationalized domain names (IDN)
 DNSSEC: presence of DS records for Domain Name System Security Extensions

Infrastructure top-level domains

Country code top-level domains

As of 20 May 2017, there were 255 country-code top-level domains, purely in the Latin alphabet, using two-character codes. , the number was 316, with the addition of internationalized domains.

Proposed internationalized ccTLDs

Internationalised domain names have been proposed for Japan and Libya.

ICANN-era generic top-level domains 
 Name: DNS name 
 Target market: intended use
 Restrictions: restrictions, if any, on who can register, and how the domain can be used
 Operator: entity the registry has been delegated to
 IDN: support for internationalized domain names (IDN)
 DNSSEC: presence of DS records for Domain Name System Security Extensions

English

A

B

C

D

E

F

G

H

I

J

K

L

M

N

O

P

Q

R

S

T

U

V

W

X

Y

Z

Chinese

French

German

Hindi

Italian

Portuguese

Spanish

Internationalized generic top-level domains
All of these TLDs are internationalized domain names (IDN) and support second-level IDNs.

 Notes: general remarks and intended use
 DNSSEC: presence of DS records for Domain Name System Security Extensions

Arabic script

Chinese characters

Cyrillic script

Japanese characters

Other script

Geographic top-level domains
 Name: DNS name 
 Entity: Target geographic area
 Notes: general remarks
 IDN: support for internationalized domain names (IDN)
 DNSSEC: presence of DS records for Domain Name System Security Extensions

Africa

Asia

Europe

North America

Oceania

South America

Internationalized geographic top-level domains

Brand top-level domains
 Name: DNS name 
 Entity: company and/or brand
 Notes: general remarks
 IDN: support for internationalized domain names (IDN)
 DNSSEC: presence of DS records for Domain Name System Security Extensions

Internationalized brand top-level domains

Special-Use Domains 
ICANN/IANA has created some Special-Use domain names which are meant for special technical purposes. ICANN/IANA owns all of the Special-Use domain names.

Non-IANA domains

Besides the TLDs managed (or at least tracked) by IANA or ICANN, other independent groups have created, or had attempted to create, their own TLDs with varying technical specifications, functions, and outcomes.

Blockchain-registered

Blockchain-based domains are registered and exchanged using a public blockchain like Ethereum. Often times, these domains serve specific functions such as creating human-readable references to smart contract addresses used in DApps or personal wallet addresses. Generally, these non-standard domains are unreachable through the normal DNS resolution process and instead require clients to use some sort of transparent web proxy or gateway to access them

Alternate roots

In the case of alternative DNS roots, organizations or projects make use of the same mechanisms of the DNS but instead take on the role of ICANN in managing and administering an entirely separate root zone, thus having the ability to create new TLDs independently. However, this doesn't make these domains any less isolated from the rest of the internet, though the ability for clients to resolve them theoretically only requires switching to a recursive DNS resolver that recognizes and serves records underneath the alternate root zone.

See also
 Country code top-level domain
 Generic top-level domain
 IDN Test TLDs
 ISO 3166-1 alpha-2, the standard for two-letter country codes, which most ccTLDs are based on
 Proposed top-level domain
 Second-level domain, information about .co.jp, .co.uk, .co.kr, .co.nf, etc.
 Public Suffix List

Explanatory notes

Internet Domain Notes

Citations

External links
 IANA's list of TLDs in machine-readable format 
 The Internet Domain Survey
 The Public Suffix List / PSL – Maintained by Mozilla
 Registry Agreements at ICANN
 Registry Agreement Termination Info Page at ICANN

Country codes
International telecommunications
Top-level domains
Top-level domains